Kumshatske is a rural settlement in Shakhtarsk Raion, Donetsk Oblast, eastern Ukraine. As of 2001 it had a population of 158 people.

References

Rural settlements in Donetsk Oblast